Drakšl is a small settlement in the Slovene Hills in the Municipality of Ormož in northeastern Slovenia. The area belongs to the traditional region of Styria and is now included in the Drava Statistical Region.

There is a small chapel dedicated to Saint Anne on the eastern edge of the settlement. It was built in the late 19th century.

References

External links
Drakšl on Geopedia

Populated places in the Municipality of Ormož